Beaver Creek is a river in Texas, a tributary of the Wichita River.

See also
List of rivers of Texas

References

USGS Geographic Names Information Service
USGS Hydrologic Unit Map - State of Texas (1974)

Rivers of Texas
Tributaries of the Red River of the South